The 1997 edition of Copa Libertadores was won by Cruzeiro of Brazil, after defeating Sporting Cristal of Peru in the final. This was Cruzeiro's second title, their first being the 1976 edition.  Cruzeiro's 1997 championship is the only time any club has won the Libertadores after losing the first 3 matches in the competition.

Teams

Group stage
River Plate bye to the second round as holders.

Group 1

Group 2

Group 3

Group 4

Group 5

Bracket

Round of 16

Quarter-finals

Semi-finals

Finals

Champion

Top goalscorers
11 goals

Alberto Acosta

9 goals

 Antonio Vidal González

8 goals

 Ivo Basay

Broadcasting rights

Americas  
  Latin America: Sportsnet, TSN, TVC Sports, Cable Mágico Deportes and Best Cable Sports
  Caribbean: Flow Sports
  Peru: Global Televisión

External links
 Copa Libertadores 1997 by Karel Stokkermans at RSSSF

1
Copa Libertadores seasons